The Men's madison event of the 2008 UCI Track Cycling World Championships was held on 29 March 2008.

Results

References

External links
 Full results at Tissottiming.com

Men's madison
UCI Track Cycling World Championships – Men's madison